Baima is a town of northwestern Wulong District in southeastern Chongqing Municipality, People's Republic of China, situated on the southern (left) bank of the Wu River downstream from the county seat, which lies  to the southeast as the crow flies,  and  east-southeast of downtown Chongqing. , it has two residential neighborhoods and ten villages under its administration:
Neighborhoods
Liufangping Community
Tiefosi Community

Villages
Tiefo Village
Banqiao Village
Dongsheng Village
Lingshan Village
Sanxi Village
Shatai Village
Yuguang Village
Yangliu Village
Baoyan Village
Chepan Village

References

Township-level divisions of Chongqing
Towns in Chongqing